Adoration is a 1928 American synchronized sound drama film with a Vitaphone musical score and sound effects. The film was released by First National Pictures, a subsidiary of Warner Bros., and directed by Frank Lloyd. It stars Billie Dove, Antonio Moreno, Emile Chautard and Lucy Doraine. The film was also issued in a shorter silent version for theatres that were not yet wired for sound.

Premise
Russian prince (Antonio Moreno), upon returning from the front, sees his wife (Billie Dove) in the company of a blackguard count. Prince becomes jealous, and, later, while attempting to break into the count's home, both he and the count are knocked unconscious by the mob. Prince, wife and count escape from Russia and eventually get to Paris, where wife is able to convince prince that it was her maid who went to the count's home.

Cast
 Billie Dove as Elena
 Antonio Moreno as Prince Serge Orloff
 Emile Chautard as Murajev
 Lucy Doraine as Ninette
 Nicholas Bela as Ivan
 Nicholas Soussanin as Vladimir
 Winifred Bryson as Baroness
 Lucien Prival as Baron

Preservation
A print of Adoration survives in the Czech Film Archive.

References

External links

Still at gettyimages.com

1928 films
First National Pictures films
1920s English-language films
Warner Bros. films
American black-and-white films
American drama films
Films scored by Karl Hajos
Films directed by Frank Lloyd
1920s American films